Geir "Gerlioz" Bratland (born 29 July 1970 in Narvik, Norway) is a Norwegian keyboardist for the band Dimmu Borgir (2010-) and formerly was a member of  the bands God Seed, Apoptygma Berzerk, The Kovenant, and Satyricon.

Discography/Performances

Emperor
Deathfest 2018 (Tilburg, Netherlands)

The Kovenant
Live performances (2003-2009)

Dimmu Borgir
Abrahadabra (2010)
Eonian (2018)

God Seed
Live at Wacken (2012)
I Begin (2012)

Apoptygma Berzerk
7 (Apoptygma Berzerk album) (1996)
APBL98 (1999)
Welcome to Earth (2000)
APBL2000 (2001)
Harmonizer (2002)
You and Me Against the World (2006)
Rocket Science (2009)
Imagine There's No Lennon (2010)

Satyricon
Nemesis Divina (1996)

References

External links

1970 births
Living people
Musicians from Narvik
Apoptygma Berzerk members
The Kovenant members
Satyricon (band) members
Dimmu Borgir members
God Seed members